Luke Adams (21 May 1838 – 24 February 1918) was a New Zealand potter. Born in Fareham, Hampshire, England, he migrated to Christchurch in 1873 to accept a post at William Neighbours' brickworks. Later, he founded Luke Adams Pottery with his sons.

Examples of his work can be found in the Museum of New Zealand Te Papa Tongarewa.

References

1838 births
1918 deaths
New Zealand potters
People from Fareham
English emigrants to New Zealand